Roy McNaughton was an Australian soccer player who played as forward for the Australia national team. He played most of his senior career with Cessnock and switched a variety of Newcastle based clubs including Kurri Kurri, Weston and Aberdare afterwards.

International career
McNaughton played for Australia twice; his debut in a 4–1 against Canada on 23 June 1924 and his final match in a 0–0 draw also against Canada on 28 June 1924.

Honours
Cessnock
 Northern NSW Premiership: 1925, 1926, 1927

Career statistics

International

References

Australian soccer players
Year of death missing
Association football forwards
Australia international soccer players